Passer is a genus of sparrows, also known as the true sparrows.

Passer may also refer to:
 PASSER program suite, a series of traffic control optimization software
 Passer (river), a river in Italy
 Passer (surname)
 Passed pawn, a type of pawn in chess

See also
 Passed ball, passed by a passer
 Passer rating
 Pass (disambiguation) for the performance of a passer
 Passing (disambiguation) for the action of a passer